Ed Genung was an American actor of the silent era notable for being the first actor to play David Copperfield on film - in David Copperfield (1911) and one of the earliest to play Ferdinand on film - in The Tempest (1911).

Born as Edward Genung, he worked in various films for the Thanhouser Company in 1911. In the summer of 1912 he was appearing in films for the Bison Company, while by 1914 he was acting with the Lubin Manufacturing Company.

Genung's other film roles include: Phil Nelson - the Messenger's Brother  in Messenger No. 845 (1914); Dick in Dick's Turning (1913); Don in Her First Choice (1912); David Copperfield in The Loves of David Copperfield (1911); The Prizefighter / Aviator in The Higher the Fewer (1911), and The Country Boy in Little Old New York (1911).

References

External links
Ed Genung on Internet Movie Database

1880s births
Year of death missing
20th-century American male actors
American stage actors
American male silent film actors
American male film actors